"So Real" is a song by American singer Mandy Moore released as a single from her 2000 reissue I Wanna Be with You. The song was first included on her 1999 debut album of the same name, So Real. The song was written and produced by Tony Battaglia and Shaun Fisher.

Upon its release, "So Real" reached number 21 on the Australian Singles Chart and number 18 on the New Zealand Singles Chart. The song was also recorded in French as "C'est si facile".

Music video
The music video for "So Real" was directed by Gregory Dark. Mandy begins singing and dancing in a meadow. Next, she appears in a secret forest. She writes in her diary and sings and dances while wearing a fairy costume. Mandy is sitting in the meadow again as the song ends. The video features a brief appearance by actress Jenna Dewan.

Track listings
Australian CD single
 "So Real"
 "Candy" (Wade Robson Remix)
 "Not Too Young"
 "So Real" (Wade Robson Remix)
 "So Real" (video clip)

French promo CD—"C'est si facile"
"C'est si facile" – 3:50
"So Real" – 3:51

Charts

References

1999 songs
2000 singles
Epic Records singles
Mandy Moore songs
Music videos directed by Gregory Dark
Songs written by Tony Battaglia

pt:So Real (canção)